Yevseyev (masculine) or Yevseyeva (feminine) is a Russian surname. Variants of this surname include Avseyev/Avseyeva (/), Avseyenko, Avseykin/Avseykina (/), Avsyukov/Avsyukova (/), Aseyev/Aseyeva (/), Yevsevenko, Yevsevyev/Yevsevyeva (/), Yevseyenko, Yevseichev/Yevseicheva (/), Yevseykin/Yevseykina (/), Yevsenov/Yevsenova (/), Yevsyonochkin/Yevsyonochkina (/), Ovseyev/Ovseyeva (/), and Ovsiyenko.

All these surnames derive from various forms of the Christian male first name Yevsevy, or its colloquial form Yevsey (or Avsey), which is of Greek origins where it means pious, devout.

Surnames Yevsikov/Yevsikova (/), Yevsyukov/Yevsyukova (/), Yevsyunin/Yevsyunina (/), Yevsyutin/Yevsyutina (/), Yevsyutkin/Yevsyutkina (/), Yevsyukhin/Yevsyukhina (/), Yevsyushin/Yevsyushina (/), and Yevsyushkin/Yevsyushkina (/) may have derived either from "Yevsey", or from Christian male first names Yevstafy or Yevstigney.

People with the surname
Alexey Yevseyev (b. 1994), Russian association football player
Inna Yevseyeva (b. 1964), Soviet female middle distance runner
Nikolay Yevseyev (b. 1966), Russian Olympic swimmer
Vadim Evseev (Vadim Yevseyev) (b. 1976), Russian association football player
Vasyl Yevseyev (1962–2010), Ukrainian association football coach and player
Vladimir Yevseyev (1939–2012), Soviet rower
Vladislav Evseev (Yevseyev) (b. 1984), Russian ice hockey player
Willi Evseev (Yevseyev) (b. 1992), German association football player
Yekaterina Yevseyeva (b. 1988), Kazakhstani high jumper
Yevhen Yevseyev (b. 1987), Ukrainian association football player

Toponyms
Yevseyev (rural locality), a rural locality (a khutor) in Krasnogvardeysky District of Belgorod Oblast, Russia

See also
Yevseyevo, several rural localities in Russia

References

Notes

Sources
И. М. Ганжина (I. M. Ganzhina). "Словарь современных русских фамилий" (Dictionary of Modern Russian Last Names). Москва, 2001. 
Ю. А. Федосюк (Yu. A. Fedosyuk). "Русские фамилии: популярный этимологический словарь" (Russian Last Names: a Popular Etymological Dictionary). Москва, 2006. 

Russian-language surnames